Thomas Hill (died 1653) was an English Puritan divine. Born at Kington, Herefordshire, he took a B.A. in 1622 at Emmanuel College, Cambridge, an M.A. in 1626, a B.D. in 1633 and a D.D. in 1646.

While Rector of Titchmarsh, Northamptonshire during the 1630s, he met the young John Dryden, who would later attend Trinity College under Hill's mastership. Leaving parochial life, Hill returned to academia, and became a Fellow of Emmanuel College, and its Master in 1643.

On 27 July 1642, Hill was called upon to preach to the House of Commons at St Margaret's Westminster:- The trade of truth advanced in a sermon to the honourable House of Commons. In October 1644, Hill was called to hear the Prince Charles I Louis, Elector Palatine address the English Parliament.

From 1645 to 1653, Thomas Hill was Master of Trinity College, Cambridge, and was also elected Vice-Chancellor of the university in 1646.

References

External links
 List of Assembly of Parliament
 The Master of Trinity at Trinity College, Cambridge
 Chemnitz University of Technology (SGML version)

17th-century births
1653 deaths
Alumni of Emmanuel College, Cambridge
Masters of Trinity College, Cambridge
Masters of Emmanuel College, Cambridge
Westminster Divines
People from Kington, Herefordshire
Vice-Chancellors of the University of Cambridge